Jászárokszállás is a town in Jász-Nagykun-Szolnok county, in the Northern Great Plain region of central Hungary.

Geography

History
First mention of Jászárokszállás was in the beginning of the 14th century.

Notable people
János Görbe (1912–1968), actor
Ferenc Donáth (1913–1986), politician
Sándor Csányi (1953-), banker, investor, business magnate, philanthropist
József Sándor (1892–?), wrestler

Twin towns – sister cities

Jászárokszállás is twinned with:
 Tarłów, Poland

References

External links

 in Hungarian

Populated places in Jász-Nagykun-Szolnok County
Jászság